The Narratives of Empire series is a heptalogy of historical novels by Gore Vidal, published between 1967 and 2000, which chronicle the dawn-to-decadence history of the "American Empire"; the narratives interweave the personal stories of two families with the personages and events of U.S. history. Despite the publisher's preference for the politically neutral series-title "American Chronicles", Vidal preferred the series title "Narratives of Empire". The seven novels can be read in either historical or publication order without losing narrative intelligibility.

References

American historical novels
Heptalogies
Novel series
Novels by Gore Vidal